Žiga Pavlin (born 30 April 1985) is a Slovenian ice hockey player. He is currently a free agent. 

He participated at several IIHF World Championships as a member of the Slovenia men's national ice hockey team.
In the 2015/2016 season, he was playing for team, HC Slavia Praha in the 1st Czech Republic Hockey League, the second highest league in the country.

Career statistics

Regular season and playoffs

International

References

External links
 Profile at SiOL portal

1985 births
Living people
IF Troja/Ljungby players
Sportspeople from Kranj
Slovenian ice hockey defencemen
Olympic ice hockey players of Slovenia
Ice hockey players at the 2014 Winter Olympics
Ice hockey players at the 2018 Winter Olympics
HC Košice players
HK Dukla Michalovce players
HC '05 Banská Bystrica players
Slovenian expatriate sportspeople in Italy
Slovenian expatriate sportspeople in Sweden
Slovenian expatriate sportspeople in the Czech Republic
Slovenian expatriate sportspeople in Slovakia
Expatriate ice hockey players in the Czech Republic
Expatriate ice hockey players in Italy
Expatriate ice hockey players in Sweden
Expatriate ice hockey players in Slovakia
Slovenian expatriate ice hockey people